Joseph or Joe Higgins may refer to:
 Joseph Higgins (bishop), Irish-born Roman Catholic bishop in Australia
 Joseph J. Higgins, member of the New Jersey General Assembly
 Joe Higgins (politician), Irish politician
 Joe Higgins (Gaelic footballer)
 Joe Higgins (actor) (1925–1998), American actor